In astrodynamics and celestial dynamics, the orbital state vectors (sometimes state vectors) of an orbit are
Cartesian vectors of position and velocity that together with their time (epoch) uniquely determine the trajectory of the orbiting body in space.

Frame of reference
State vectors are defined with respect to some frame of reference, usually but not always an inertial reference frame. One of the more popular reference frames for the state vectors of bodies moving near Earth is the Earth-centered equatorial system defined as follows:

The origin is Earth's center of mass;
The Z axis is coincident with Earth's rotational axis, positive northward;
The X/Y plane coincides with Earth's equatorial plane, with the +X axis pointing toward the vernal equinox and the Y axis completing a right-handed set.

This reference frame is not truly inertial because of the slow, 26,000 year precession of Earth's axis, so the reference frames defined by Earth's orientation at a standard astronomical epoch such as B1950 or J2000 are also commonly used.

Many other reference frames can be used to meet various application requirements, including those centered on the Sun or on other planets or moons, the one defined by the barycenter and total angular momentum of the solar system (in particular the ICRF), or even a spacecraft's own orbital plane and angular momentum.

Position and velocity vectors

The position vector  describes the position of the body in the chosen frame of reference, while the velocity vector  describes its velocity in the same frame at the same time. Together, these two vectors and the time at which they are valid uniquely describe the body's trajectory as detailed in Orbit determination.

The body does not actually have to be in orbit for its state vectors to determine its trajectory; it only has to move ballistically, i.e., solely under the effects of its own inertia and gravity. For example, it could be a spacecraft or missile in a suborbital trajectory. If other forces such as drag or thrust are significant, they must be added vectorially to those of gravity when performing the integration to determine future position and velocity.

For any object moving through space, the velocity vector is tangent to the trajectory. If  is the unit vector tangent to the trajectory, then

Derivation
The velocity vector  can be derived from position vector  by differentiation with respect to time:

An object's state vector can be used to compute its classical or Keplerian orbital elements and vice versa. Each representation has its advantages. The elements are more descriptive of the size, shape and orientation of an orbit, and may be used to quickly and easily estimate the object's state at any arbitrary time provided its motion is accurately modeled by the two-body problem with only small perturbations.

On the other hand, the state vector is more directly useful in a numerical integration that accounts for significant, arbitrary, time-varying forces such as drag, thrust and gravitational perturbations from third bodies as well as the gravity of the primary body.

Because even satellites in low Earth orbit experience significant perturbations from Earth's non-spherical shape, Solar Radiation Pressure, Moon Tidal Effects, and Atmospheric Drag, the Keplerian elements computed from the state vector at any moment are only valid for a short period of time and need to be recomputed often to determine a valid object state. Such element sets are known as osculating elements because they coincide with the actual orbit only at that moment. Orbital State Vectors come in many forms including the traditional Position-Velocity vectors, Two-line element set (TLE), and Vector Covariance Matrix (VCM).

See also
 ECEF
 Earth-centered inertial
 Orbital plane
 Orbit determination
 State vector (navigation)

References

Orbits
Vectors (mathematics and physics)